The  is a public professional graduate school at Shinagawa, Tokyo, Japan, established in 2006.

The school offers professional education programs in project-based learning (PBL) method.

The school is operated by the Tokyo Metropolitan Public University Corporation, an extra-departmental body organization of the Tokyo Metropolitan Government.

Organization

Programs 
 Business Systems Design Engineering Course
 Innovation for Design and Engineering Course
 Information Systems Architecture Course

Campus 
 1-10-40 Higashi-Ōi, Shinagawa-Ku, Tokyo 140-0011, Japan

References

External links
 Official website 
 Official website

Educational institutions established in 2006
Public universities in Japan
Universities and colleges in Tokyo
Engineering universities and colleges in Japan
2006 establishments in Japan